Crateva nurvala is an accepted name for a small tree in the genus Crateva and the family Capparaceae.  However, the Catalogue of Life lists this as a synonym of C. magna.

Distribution

The small wild or cultivated tree is widespread from India to Southeast Asia, south of China. It occurs on glades, at the edge of a forest, near rivers and lakes, etc.

Traditional medicine
The dried bark is used raw drug in traditional systems of medicine in India such as Ayurveda and Siddha.

References

External links
 
 India Biodiversity

Medicinal plants of Asia
Capparaceae
Flora of Indo-China
Flora of India (region)
Plants described in 1872